Sowjanya Bavisetti (born 11 December 1993) is an Indian tennis player.

Bavisetti has a career-high singles ranking by the Women's Tennis Association (WTA) of 500, achieved on 3 October 2022. She also has a career-high WTA doubles ranking of 402, set on 24 February 2014. She has won three singles titles and nine doubles titles at tournaments of the ITF Circuit.

Representing India in the Fed Cup, Bavisetti has a career win-loss record of 1–6.

ITF finals

Singles: 6 (3–3)

Doubles: 20 (9–11)

References

External links
 
 
 

1993 births
Living people
Indian female tennis players
Racket sportspeople from Hyderabad, India
Sportswomen from Telangana
South Asian Games gold medalists for India
South Asian Games silver medalists for India
South Asian Games medalists in tennis